KMSR (1520 AM) is a radio station in Mayville, North Dakota, licensed to Northwood, serving the Red River Valley of eastern North Dakota and northwest Minnesota. Formerly known as "Sports Radio 1520", KMSR rebranded as "99KMSR" upon launching an FM translator in late 2020. KMSR 1520 AM is on the air in the daytime only, so it signs off at sunset, and signs on again at sunrise. Its translator, K255DG, operates 24 hours a day on 98.9 FM.

Programming
KMSR airs The Dan Patrick Show, The Herd with Colin Cowherd, and The Rich Eisen Show, occasionally preempted by local sports coverage. KMSR covers the Red River Valley area, including Mayville, Grand Forks, and Fargo. Simulcast for many years, KMAV-FM and KMSR (formerly KMAV) have been broadcasting separate programming since November 2003.

Family matters
KMSR is family owned. Five-time North Dakota Sportscaster of the Year, Dan Keating, calls basketball, baseball, football, volleyball, and softball. His wife, Mary, is the company's president.  Their sons, Craig and Mike, are also active in the company.

Sports
In addition to local sports and syndicated sports talk, KMSR carries NFL, college football, and college basketball games from Westwood One and Sports USA Radio networks.

Translators
KMSR broadcasts on the following FM translator:

External links
KMAV/KMSR website

MAV
Sports radio stations in the United States
Radio stations established in 1967
MSR
1967 establishments in North Dakota
Mayville, North Dakota